The Lycée Montaigne is a French public secondary school. It is located in the 6th arrondissement of Paris, near the Jardin du Luxembourg, and was founded in the 1880s.

The school currently has around 800 pupils at the Collège level, and 1,000 pupils at the Lycée level. The school also offers classes préparatoires for 150 pupils. The lycée has science (S), literature (L) and economics (ES) sections. The classes préparatoires are specialized in economics (ECE and ECS).

It also has two international sections, in Portuguese and Polish.

Alumni

Famous alumni of the Lycée Montaigne include:

Alexis Bossard, musician and drummer
André Weinfeld, writer, director, producer
Frédéric Beigbeder, writer
Adèle Haenel, actress
René Clair, filmmaker
Michel Debré, former French Prime Minister
Richard Descoings, director of the Paris Institute of Political Studies
Karl Lagerfeld, fashion designer
Régis Laspalès, comedian and actor
Jean-Marie Lustiger, former archbishop of Paris
Phetsarath, former Prime Minister of Laos
Renaud, singer
Wilfrid Sellars, philosopher
Karl Stoeckel, president of the student union Union Nationale Lycéenne in 2005-2006
Roland Barthes, cultural theorist, essayist, literary critic
Tanguy Serra, president of SolarCity, now a subsidiary of Tesla

See also

There is an unrelated Lycée Montaigne in Bordeaux, the website of which is http://montaigne.bordeaux.free.fr .

External links
 http://www.montaigne-paris.fr 

Montaigne
Buildings and structures in the 6th arrondissement of Paris